Maryse Gaudreault (born July 6, 1959) is a Canadian politician, who was a member of the National Assembly of Quebec for the riding of Hull from 2008 to 2022.

Gaudreault was elected for the Quebec Liberal Party on May 12, 2008 in Hull during a by-election. She replaced former MNA Roch Cholette, with whom Gaudreault worked as a political assistant from 2000 until his resignation on April 9, 2008. Gaudreault also previously worked as director of the Hull's CHSLD Foundation as well as for organisations linked to women and sport development. She also holds a diploma in computer sciences from the Institut de data processing de Québec.

Gaudreault was elected with 45% of the vote defeating local doctor Gilles Aubé from the Parti Québécois and community activist Bill Clennett of Québec solidaire as well as Brian Gibb, the director of the Quebec Green Party.

She was named on June 3, 2008 the Parliamentary Assistant for the Minister of Culture, Communications and Status of Women, Christine St-Pierre.

Gaudreault retained the seat in the general election held a few months later and in the 2014 general election.

She was defeated by Suzanne Tremblay of the Coalition Avenir Québec in the 2022 Quebec general election.

Electoral record

References

External links
 

1959 births
French Quebecers
Living people
Politicians from Gatineau
Politicians from Quebec City
Quebec Liberal Party MNAs
Women MNAs in Quebec
Vice Presidents of the National Assembly of Quebec
21st-century Canadian politicians
21st-century Canadian women politicians